Tristan John de Vere Cole (born 16 March 1935) is an English television director, now retired.

In his first career, he was a Royal Navy Officer for seven years.

Life
Cole is believed to be the last-surviving illegitimate son of the painter Augustus John (1878–1961). His mother, Mavis Cole, met John at the Café Royal in 1928, and agreed to model for him. In 1931 she married Horace de Vere Cole, a well-known Edwardian practical joker, then in 1932 became the mistress of Augustus John. Cole was brought up in the John household at Fryern Court, Fordingbridge, from the age of 18 months, partly by his mother, and then later by Dorelia McNeill.

Cole was educated for three years at Kelly College, Tavistock, from thirteen to sixteen, and then from 1951 trained for a naval career at the Royal Naval College, Dartmouth. He went on to serve as an officer in the Royal Navy from 1953 to 1960. After his return to civilian life, Cole worked at the Bristol Old Vic as Assistant Stage Manager and actor, before moving on to a career with BBC television.

He married Diana Crosby Cook in 1962 and with her has a son, Cassian de Vere Cole, born in 1966, a fine art dealer in London.

In 1993 Cole met Prudence Murdoch, a divorced lawyer with three children, and they set up house together near Newbury in Berkshire. They were married in 2000 and stayed together until her death in 2010.

He now lives in Sutton Scotney, not far from his partner Anne Stow, eldest grandchild of Neville Chamberlain, a former prime minister, whose wife was a sister of Horace de Vere Cole.

Work as television director
Z-Cars (episodes in 1968)
Doctor Who: The Wheel in Space (1968)
Take Three Girls (1969) 
Emmerdale Farm (1972–1973)
Trinity Tales (1975)
Angels (1976)
Survivors (1977 episodes)
Secret Army (1979)
Juliet Bravo (1980)
The Spoils of War (1981)
Howards' Way (1985–1988)
Rockliffe's Folly (1988)
Bergerac (1988–1992)
 Trainer (1992)

Work as film director
Orion's Belt (1985)
The Dive (1990)

Publications
 with Roderic Owen, Beautiful and Beloved: the Life of Mavis de Vere Cole (Hutchinson, 1974)

References

IMDb biography

External links

1935 births
Royal Navy officers
Military personnel from Berkshire
British film directors
Graduates of Britannia Royal Naval College
Living people
People educated at Kelly College
People from Redruth
People from Newbury, Berkshire
People from the City of Winchester